Lake Peigneur (pronounced ) is a brackish lake in the U.S. state of Louisiana,  north of Delcambre and  west of New Iberia, near the northernmost tip of Vermilion Bay. Its name comes from the French word "peigneur", meaning "one who combs."

It was a  freshwater body, popular with sportsmen, until an unusual man-made disaster on November 20, 1980 changed its structure and the surrounding land.

Drilling disaster
On Thursday, November 20, 1980, the drill assembly of a Texaco-contracted oil rig pierced an inactive third level of the nearby Diamond Crystal Salt Company salt mine. The hole produced a vortex that drained the lake into the mine, filling the enormous caverns that had been left by the removal of salt. 
Pillars of salt had been left in place to support the ceiling at each level. The pillars were dissolved by the incroaching fresh water and caused the mine tunnels to collapse.

So much water drained into the caverns that the flow of the Delcambre Canal that usually empties the lake into Vermilion Bay was reversed, causing salt water from the Gulf of Mexico to flow into what was now a dry lakebed. Air displaced by water flowing into the mine caverns erupted through the mineshafts as compressed air and then later as  geysers.

Although there were no human deaths, three dogs were reported killed. All 55 employees in the mine at the time of the accident escaped, with six employees later given awards by Diamond Crystal for heroism. Their successful evacuation was thanks to the mine's electrician who noticed a torrent of water and sounded the alarm, as well as the employees' discipline and training making their escape via the only elevator in an orderly fashion. The crew of 7 on the drilling rig fled the platform shortly before it collapsed into the new depths of the lake. A fisherman who was on the lake at the time piloted his small boat to shore and escaped. Days after the disaster, once the water pressure equalized, nine of the eleven sunken barges popped out of the whirlpool and refloated on the lake's surface.

Cause 

On the date of the disaster, an oil rig contracted by Texaco was conducting exploratory drilling in the lake alongside a salt dome under Lake Peigneur. The salt dome contained the Diamond Crystal Salt Company salt mine. The rig's  drill assembly had become stuck at  two-and-a-half hours before the drilling rig began to tilt. 

The drill assembly punctured the salt mine beneath the lake, and the lake soon began entering the salt mine. Over the course of several hours, the fresh lake water began dissolving the salt and enlarging the hole, causing the lake to drain into the salt mine. 

Experts from the Mine Safety and Health Administration were unable to determine the exact blame because they were unable to determine  whether Texaco was drilling in the wrong place or if the mine's maps were inaccurate. 

The evidence that could be used to identify the exact cause was destroyed or washed away in the ensuing maelstrom. After the fact, engineers from Texaco and Diamond Crystal worked together to pinpoint the likely location of the hole which may have pierced the mine. They placed it within a mined out portion of the 1300-foot level of the mine.

Aftermath
Texaco and the drilling contractor Wilson Brothers paid $32 million to Diamond Crystal and $12.8 million to a nearby botanical garden and plant nursery, Live Oak Gardens, in out-of-court settlements to compensate for the damage caused. The Mine Safety and Health Administration released a report on the disaster in August 1981 which exhaustively documented the event but stopped short of identifying an official reason for the disaster. The mine was finally closed in December 1986.

Since 1994, AGL Resources has used Lake Peigneur's underlying salt dome as a storage and hub facility for pressurized natural gas. There was concern from local residents in 2009 over the safety of storing the gas under the lake and nearby drilling operations.

Salinity

The former freshwater lake was turned saline by the inflow of salt water from the Delcambre Canal and Vermilion Bay. The event permanently affected the ecosystem of the lake and increased the depth of part of the lake.

See also
 Bayou Corne sinkhole
Döda fallet
 Lake Beloye (Nizhny Novgorod Oblast)
 List of sinkholes of the United States
 Rylands v Fletcher

References

External links
 Lake Peigneur: The biggest sinkhole ever created (archived)

 Endangered Earth - Sinkholes Assorted
  Contains a description of the event, with a focus on the geology of the region.
 Mine-mouth geyser problem, Chemical Engineering Education, an in-depth discussion of how the inrush of water could have created a powerful geyser
 
 The podcast Eclipsed has a two-part episode about Lake Peigneur. Part 1 Part 2

Bodies of water of Iberia Parish, Louisiana
Disasters in Louisiana
Engineering failures
Environment of Louisiana
Environmental disasters in the United States
Peigneur
Landforms of Iberia Parish, Louisiana
Oil platform disasters
Peigneur
Salt domes
Sinkholes of the United States
Texaco
1980 industrial disasters